Jarred Lynn Cosart (born May 25, 1990) is an American former professional baseball pitcher. He played in Major League Baseball (MLB) for the Houston Astros, Miami Marlins and San Diego Padres.

Career
Cosart attended Clear Creek High School in League City, Texas. He signed a letter of intent with the University of Missouri.

Philadelphia Phillies
Cosart was drafted by the Philadelphia Phillies in the 38th round of the 2008 Major League Baseball Draft, and signed with the Phillies.

MLB.com rated Cosart the Phillies' third best prospect going into 2011, while Baseball America rated him #70 in all of baseball. He represented the Phillies in the All-Star Futures Game in 2010 and 2011.

Houston Astros
At the 2011 trade deadline, Cosart was traded to the Houston Astros with Jon Singleton, Domingo Santana, and Josh Zeid, for Hunter Pence.

Cosart started the 2013 season with the Triple-A Oklahoma City RedHawks. He was called up by the Astros on July 12, 2013, and made his MLB debut against the Tampa Bay Rays. During his debut, he took a no-hitter through 6.1 innings until a single by Ben Zobrist. Cosart pitched 8+ innings with 2 strikeouts, 2 hits allowed, and 3 walks issued, to get his first major league win.  Cosart was critical of Houston management later in his Astros career, leading to him being traded to Miami.

Miami Marlins
On July 31, 2014, the Astros traded Cosart, Enrique Hernández, and Austin Wates to the Miami Marlins for Jake Marisnick, Colin Moran, Francis Martes, and a compensatory draft pick.

Cosart started the season in the Marlins rotation and was 1–3 with a 4.08 ERA. On May 19, 2015, Cosart was placed on the disabled list with a case of vertigo. After a month on the disabled list, Cosart was activated and sent to the Marlins bullpen. Cosart returned to the rotation on July 4 but was sent down a day after by Miami to AAA.

San Diego Padres
On July 29, 2016, the Marlins traded Cosart, Josh Naylor, Carter Capps, and Luis Castillo to the San Diego Padres for Andrew Cashner, Colin Rea, Tayron Guerrero, and cash considerations. He elected to become a free agent after the Padres outrighted him on October 30, 2017.

Personal life
Cosart is the grandson of former Chicago Cubs' pitcher Ed Donnelly. His younger brother, Jake Cosart, was drafted by the Boston Red Sox in 2014 and has pitched in Minor League Baseball.

References

External links

1990 births
Living people
People from League City, Texas
Baseball players from Texas
Major League Baseball pitchers
Houston Astros players
Miami Marlins players
San Diego Padres players
Sportspeople from Harris County, Texas
Florida Complex League Phillies players
Lakewood BlueClaws players
Clearwater Threshers players
Corpus Christi Hooks players
Mesa Solar Sox players
Oklahoma City RedHawks players
Gulf Coast Marlins players
Jupiter Hammerheads players
Jacksonville Suns players
New Orleans Zephyrs players